General elections were held in Fiji in August and September 2001. The Soqosoqo Duavata ni Lewenivanua party won 18 of the 23 seats reserved for ethnic Fijians and one of three "general electorates" set aside for Fiji's European, Chinese, and other minorities. It also won 13 of the 25 "open electorates," so-called because they are open to candidates of any race and are elected by universal suffrage.  The remaining five ethnic Fijian seats, and one open electorate, were won by the Conservative Alliance, one of whom was George Speight who had led the putsch against the lawful government the year before. Chaudhry's Labour Party won all 19 Indo-Fijian seats and eight open electorates.  The New Labour Unity Party, formed by defectors from the FLP, won one general electorate and one open electorate.  The three remaining seats (one general electorate, one open electorate, and the Rotuman Islanders' seat) were won by minor parties and independent candidates.

Background
The Constitution of Fiji was restored by a High Court decision on 15 November 2000, following the failure of the political upheaval in which the government had been deposed and the constitution suspended in May that year.  On 1 March 2001, the Appeal Court upheld the decision.  An election to restore democracy was held in September 2001.  In what was one of Fiji's most bitterly fought elections ever, the newly formed Soqosoqo Duavata ni Lewenivanua of the interim Prime Minister Laisenia Qarase narrowly defeated the Fiji Labour Party of deposed former Prime Minister Mahendra Chaudhry.

The FLP had been hurt by leadership bickering in the wake of the coup, and the subsequent defection of a number of its high-profile members from the ethnic Fijian community, including Tupeni Baba, the former Deputy Prime Minister.  The mutual refusal of the FLP and the National Federation Party, the only other political party with significant Indo-Fijian support, to reach a preference-swapping deal had also worked against both parties.  (In Fiji's system of transferable voting, any two or more candidates in a particular constituency can have their votes combined, unless the electors specify a different option by ranking the candidates numerically in order of their preference).

Results

Communal constituency results

Fijian constituencies

Indo-Fijian constituencies

General constituencies

Rotuman constituency

Seats changing hands
This does not include seats that changed candidates but not parties, defections or seats held by members not seeking re-election.

Aftermath
Controversy continued after the 2001 election, with Prime Minister Qarase finding reasons, which many considered to be pretexts, for not implementing the power-sharing provisions of the Constitution, which required that every political party with more than 8 seats in the House of Representatives must be proportionally represented in the Cabinet.  On 18 July 2003, the Supreme Court of Fiji ruled that Qarase's exclusion of the Labour Party from the Cabinet was unconstitutional, and demanded that the situation be rectified.  Appeals, counter-appeals, and negotiations delayed the implementation of the order.  In June 2004, the Supreme Court ruled that the Labour Party was entitled to 14 out of 30 Cabinet posts. Qarase has said that he would abide by the ruling, but his refusal to include Chaudhry in the Cabinet lineup continued to stall negotiations, until the FLP announced in November that it was no longer interested in participating in the Qarase-led government.

References

Elections in Fiji
Fiji
General
Fiji
Fiji